Robert Ian Brightwell MBE (27 October 1939 – 6 March 2022) was a British track and field athlete and silver medallist.

Biography
Brightwell was born in Rawalpindi, British Raj (now part of Pakistan), but moved to the UK with his family in 1946 and grew up in Donnington, Telford, Shropshire. He was educated at Trench Secondary Modern School where he became head boy and set a number of school running records, and he played as goalkeeper in the local Donnington Swifts football team. He gained his athletic training at Shrewsbury Technical College and went on to become a sportsmaster at Tiffin Boys' School in Surrey, England.

He was known for his quarter-mile running races, with his first major race taking place during 1961.  He broke the British record for 440 yards as well as the European 400 metres record.

During the Olympic Games held in Tokyo, he was captain of the men's British Olympic Team. Running the final stage in the men's 4 x 400 metres relay, he passed Wendell Mottley of Trinidad and Tobago to finish second to Henry Carr of the US. In the individual 400 metres he finished fourth.

His fiancée at that time was Ann Packer who won a gold medal in the women's 800 metres (run) on the day after the men's individual 400 metres final.  After winning a silver medal in the 400 metres Packer had no plans to run in the 800 metres and had a shopping trip planned until Brightwell's disappointing 400 metres. She said she ran it for him and broke the world record in the process.

The captaincy of the British Team and his silver medal was the climax of his career. Aged 24 years early in 1964 he announced that he would retire after the Olympic Games. He and Packer were each appointed Member of the Order of the British Empire (MBE) in the 1965 New Year Honours for services to athletics.

Brightwell and Packer were married on 19 December 1964 and had three sons: Gary, and two former Manchester City players Ian and David. Brightwell went into teaching before moving to lecture at the then Loughborough College and before taking up successive directorships with sports companies Adidas UK and Le Coq Sportif UK. He also ran a fishing tackle business for thirty years.

Brightwell lived in Congleton, Cheshire. He died in March 2022, at the age of 82.

References

1939 births
2022 deaths
People from Congleton
Athletes from Punjab, Pakistan
Sportspeople from Rawalpindi
English male sprinters
British male sprinters
Olympic athletes of Great Britain
Olympic silver medallists for Great Britain
Athletes (track and field) at the 1960 Summer Olympics
Athletes (track and field) at the 1964 Summer Olympics
English Olympic medallists
Commonwealth Games gold medallists for England
Commonwealth Games silver medallists for England
Commonwealth Games medallists in athletics
Athletes (track and field) at the 1962 British Empire and Commonwealth Games
European Athletics Championships medalists
Alumni of Loughborough University
Sportspeople from Cheshire
Medalists at the 1964 Summer Olympics
Olympic silver medalists in athletics (track and field)
Members of the Order of the British Empire
English schoolteachers
Medallists at the 1962 British Empire and Commonwealth Games